Philippe Burrin (born March 16, 1952, in Chamoson, Switzerland) is a historian whose research focuses on ideologies, movements and political parties in Europe during the interwar period. With his work on the Second World War, he tried to define the notions of mass violence and genocide.

After earning an undergraduate degree in international relations (1975), he obtained his doctorate in political science (1985) at the Graduate Institute of International Studies in Geneva under the supervision of Saul Friedländer, a specialist in Nazi Germany.

Burrin was a professor in contemporary history (1982-1988) at the University of Geneva, before returning to the Geneva Graduate Institute first as assistant professor (1988-1993), and then professor of history of international relations. In 2004, he became director of the Geneva Graduate Institute, a position held until 2020.

In his book "La dérive fasciste, Doriot, Déat, Bergery, 1933-1945," Burrin sought to trace the intellectual, political and ideological itinerary of Jacques Doriot, Marcel Déat and Gaston Bergery, left-wing French politicians whose views shifted from anti-fascism to embracing far-right movements and collaborating with the Vichy regime. In his analysis, Burrin points to the significance of France's social and political crisis during the interwar period, and seeks to demonstrate the process of the dissemination of fascism in France through this "fascistoid nebula". Indeed, if Déat, Doriot and Bergery borrowed elements from fascist ideology, the integral pacifism which united them (through the experience of the Great War) came up against the adoption of the ideology of territorial expansion specific to the fascism leading Burrin to speak of "deficit fascisms".

Burrin deepened this thesis in "La France à l'heure allemande 1940-1944," which analyzed how the French reacted and behaved during the German occupation and toward the occupier.

In "Hitler and the Jews," Burrin offered a probable account of the sequence of events and Hitler's role in the decision to murder the Jews.

Burrin is interested in forms of "accommodation" with the occupier, which he articulates by looking at the behavior of public figures and politicians, the clergy, employers, intellectuals, artists and collaborators.

Burrin is one of a handful of French scholars thought to have made a "decisive contribution" to the understanding of fascism and of the Shoah.

Alongside his research, Burrin is involved in several projects driven by a concern for the "duty of memory". Thus, he assisted in designing the information center of the Mahnmal Holocaust Memorial in Berlin (2001). He was also a member of the Historical Commission of the Foundation for the Memory of the Shoah of Paris. And he was a member of the Scientific Council for an International History of the Shoah.

Like Jean-Pierre Azéma, Henri Amouroux, Marc-Olivier Baruch, Jean Lacouture, Robert O. Paxton and René Rémond, Burrin testified as an expert at the trial of Maurice Papon in Bordeaux in 1997. During his intervention, he insisted on the knowledge of the French, before the war, of Nazi Germany's cruelty towards the Jews, particularly in Poland.

Publications 

 , [présentation en ligne], [présentation en ligne].
 Hitler et les Juifs. Genèse d’un génocide, Paris, Le Seuil, 200 p., 1989 (édition de poche, 1995) 
 , [présentation en ligne].
 Réédition : .
 Fascisme, nazisme, autoritarisme, Paris, Le Seuil, 315 p., 2000 
 Strands of Nazi Anti-sémitism, Oxford, Europaeum, 44 p., 2004.
 Ressentiment et apocalypse. Essai sur l’antisémitisme nazi, Paris, Le Seuil, 112 p., 2004 (Trad. esp.: Resentimiento y apocalipsis, Buenos Aires/Madrid, Katz editores S.A, 2007 
 6 juin 44 (avec Jean-Pierre Azéma et Robert O. Paxton), Paris, Perrin, 207 p., 2004

Awards 

 François-Millepierres Award of the French Academy en 1990, for his book Hitler et les juifs. Genèse d’un génocide.
 Max-Planck Forschungspreis Award en 1997.

References

Living people
1952 births
People from Valais
Historians of fascism
Historians of Nazism
Historians of the Holocaust
Scholars of antisemitism
Political historians
Swiss historians
Graduate Institute of International and Development Studies alumni
Academic staff of the Graduate Institute of International and Development Studies